The 2021 season was AIK 130th in existence, their 93nd season in Allsvenskan and their 16th consecutive season in the league.

Season events
On 23 December 2020, AIK announced that Samuel Brolin had joined Mjällby on a season-long loan deal for the upcoming season.

On 21 January, AIK announced the signing of Jetmir Haliti from Jönköpings Södra to a three-year contract.

On 1 February, AIK announced that they'd agreed a deal with Groningen for Paulos Abraham, that would see him initially join the Eredivisie club on loan, and then join permanently on 1 July.

On 22 February, AIK announced the signing of Lucas Forsberg from Sollentuna to a three-year contract.

On 26 February, AIK announced the return of Nicolás Stefanelli, signing a three-year contract from Unión La Calera.

On 29 March, AIK announced the return of Alexander Milošević, to a one-year contract from Vejle, with the option of two more years. On the same day, Robin Tihi joined AFC Eskilstuna on a season-long loan deal.

On 15 July, AIK announced the signing of Zachary Elbouzedi from Lincoln City to a four-year contract.

On 24 July, AIK announced that Eric Kahl had joined AGF.

On 9 August, AIK announced the signing of Kristoffer Nordfeldt from Gençlerbirliği on a contract until the end of the season. Two days later, 11 August, AIK announced that Felix Melki had joined AFC Eskilstuna on loan for the remainder of the season.

On 3 September, AIK announced the signing of Henry Atola from Tusker, with the player officially joining on 1 January 2022 on a contract until 1 September 2026.

Squad

Out on loan

Transfers

In

Out

Loans out

Released

Friendlies

Competitions

Overview

Allsvenskan

League table

Results summary

Results by matchday

Results

2020–21 Svenska Cupen

Group stage

2021–22 Svenska Cupen

Progressed to the 2022 season

Squad statistics

Appearances and goals

|-
|colspan="14"|Players away on loan:

|-
|colspan="14"|Players who appeared for AIK but left during the season:

|}

Goal scorers

Clean sheets

Disciplinary record

References

AIK Fotboll seasons
AIK Fotboll